This is the list of shopping malls in Lebanon.

Beirut 
 ABC Mall Ashrafieh
 ABC Mall Verdun
 Beirut Souks
 Dunes Center
 Verdun 730 & 732 
 The Spot

Greater Beirut 
 ABC Department Store, Dbayeh
 Abraj Center, Furn esh Shubbak
 Beirut Mall, Chyah
 Boutique Mall, Dbayeh
 Centre Galaxy, Chyah
 Centro Mall, Jnah
 City Center Beirut, Hazmiyeh
 City Mall(Previously Janane Farah Mall), Dora
 Gibran  Mall
 Karout Mall, Hazmiyeh
 Le Mall Sin el Fil
 Le Mall Dbayeh
 The Spot Choueifat

Tripoli 
 ABC Department Store Tripoli

Beqaa 
 Cascada Village, Al Marj

Saida 
 Le Mall Saida
 Saida Mall
 Jad Centre

Nabatieh 
 Mini Mall
 The Spot Nabatieh

See also

 01
Shopping malls
Lebanon
Business in Lebanon
Retailing in Lebanon